Henrotius jordai is a species of beetles in the family Carabidae, the only species in the genus Henrotius.

References

Pterostichinae
Endemic fauna of the Balearic Islands
Monotypic Carabidae genera